Oxygen is a 2017 Indian Telugu-language action thriller film produced by S. Aishwarya on Sri Sai Raam Creations banner, presented by A. M. Rathnam and directed by A. M. Jyothi Krishna. The film stars Gopichand, Raashi Khanna, and Anu Emmanuel, while Jagapathi Babu, Shaam and Abhimanyu Singh play supporting roles and music was composed by Yuvan Shankar Raja. Formally launched on 17 December 2015, the film was released theatrically on 30 November 2017. It was released in Tamil as Asuravettai in 2020.

Plot
Raghupati is a landlord who lives with his brothers Sripathi, Chalapathi, and Ganapathi along with their family. He decides to get his daughter Shruti married to an NRI Krishna Prasad for her safety after his brother Sripathi is killed by two mysterious attackers. Contrary to the family's expectations, Krishna turns out to be a well-cultured man and wins over everyone with his nature, but Shruti doesn't want to leave her family after their marriage. Raghupati's enemies continue trying to kill his family members, and in one such encounter with Veerabhadram, who wants Raghupati's family killed, 

Krishna warns Veerabhadram not to target the family again. Shruti has a change of heart but pleads with Krishna to leave behind his business and stay in the village. He accepts before the two attackers arrive. However, Krishna Beheads Shruthi's brother Mahendra and kills other men with the help of the killers. He also kills Ganapathi and holds Shruthi hostage. Upon being questioned by Shruthi for his deeds, Krishna reveals his past.

Past: Krishna is revealed to be Sanjeev, an Indian Army Major, and the killers are none other than his colleagues, Captain Amit and Sathya. When Krishna's brother Ajay commits suicide due to lung cancer caused by chain-smoking, he investigates with the help of his microbiologist girlfriend Geetha. They find a heavy dose of opium mixed in cigarettes manufactured by the Tiger brand. Sanjeev and his higher officers start "MISSION OXYGEN" and get the brand destroyed. While returning to duty, Sanjeev learns that someone was trying to inquire about him and his family and warns Geetha.

It is revealed that Raghupati's brothers are the real owners of the Tiger Brand where they killed Sanjeev's parents. To prevent them from knowing about Sanjeev, Geetha leaks the gas cylinder and causes an explosion which kills her. However, the men survived and escaped while Sanjeev was shattered after listening to everything on his phone. Amit and Sathya killed Sripathi, who learned that Sanjeev was inquiring about the attackers. His death terrified Raghupathi's family members, who stopped leaving the house. Sanjeev sent details about the marriage to Raghupati via Sripathi's phone, and thus came as Krishna Prasad to kill the family members responsible for destroying his family. 

Present: Shruti is now convinced and decides to help Sanjeev by retrieving the cigar formula. They manage to retrieve the black money locked in a safe by Raghupati's brothers and distribute it to the affected parties. Learning from Chalapathi about Sanjeev's truth and Shruti's kidnapping, Raghupati is shocked and suffers a heart stroke where he is admitted to the hospital. A CBI officer tries to catch Sanjeev after the money distribution but in vain. Sanjeev and his colleagues break into the factory to retrieve the formula while Shruti uploads the link to a live broadcast of the operation. A fight leads to Amit, Sathya's, and Chalapathi's death and Sanjeev getting shot by Raghupati. 

Raghupathi reveals himself to be the real creator of the formula and has the formula hidden in his mind. Through Live broadcast. everyone learns of Raghupathi's true nature. Sanjeev urges people by saying No Smoking for the last time and then proceeds to jump into the fire along with Raghupati, killing him and blasting the factory. The public is motivated to give up smoking, while the police close the case and declare Sanjeev dead. However, he is revealed to be alive in Bombay after the CBI officer, who tried to catch him assures support whenever needed.

Cast

Soundtrack

Music composed by Yuvan Shankar Raja. Music released on ADITYA Music Company. The audio launch function held on 23 October 2017 at Hyderabad.

Reception 
The film received mixed reviews from critics with praise towards the cast performances, action sequences, music and direction, but criticism for writing, narration and background score.

Critical Reception 
The Times of India gave the film a rating of two out of five stars and wrote that "‘Oxygen’ is a film with a story and cast that had a lot of potential, if only it was made differently. Steer clear of this one, unless you have some time to kill". Sify wrote that "This Gopichand starrer is like watching two films on a single ticket. The entire first half runs on flimsy sequences. While the second half is handled fairly better but by then we lose all interest in the movie. Uneven narration is a major issue". The Indian Express gave the film a rating of two out of five stars and noted that " Except for our common sense, this film can't offend any section of the society". Deccan Chronicle gave the film a rating of two out of five stars and wrote that "Jyothi Krishna's take on the illegal tobacco trade is fresh, but suffers in the narration. He takes almost the entire first half to establish his point, which could be a tad too late".

Similarity 

The 2022 Kannada film James starring Puneeth Rajkumar is similar to this film.

References

External links
 

2017 films
2010s Telugu-language films
Indian action thriller films
2017 action thriller films
Films about smoking
Films scored by Yuvan Shankar Raja
Films directed by Jyothi Krishna (director)